Fruzsina Schildkraut (born 30 March 1998) is a Hungarian footballer who plays as a goalkeeper for Diósgyőri VTK and the Hungary women's national team.

Career
Schildkraut is a member of the Hungary senior national team. She made her debut for the team on 17 September 2020 against Sweden, coming on as a substitute for Dóra Süle. The goalkeeper that started the match, Barbara Bíró, was sent off.

Personal life
Her father, Krisztián Schildkraut, was a volleyball player at international level.

References

1998 births
Living people
Women's association football goalkeepers
Hungarian women's footballers
Hungary women's youth international footballers
Hungary women's international footballers